Zameen.com is a property search engine in Pakistan that lists real estate dealers, developers, agencies, and properties for sale and rent. The company is headquartered in Lahore, Pakistan, has offices in 30 cities across Pakistan, including Karachi, Lahore, Quetta, Islamabad, Gujranwala, Faisalabad, Peshawar and Multan.

History
Zameen.com was founded in 2006 by two Pakistani entrepreneur brothers, Zeeshan and Imran Ali Khan. The brothers had been running a B2B classifieds portal in the United Kingdom, but decided to return and seek opportunities in Pakistan. They began operations in an apartment in Lahore, trying to convince property agents to go online, with the fact that most of the agents did not even know how to use computers or access the web. For the first few years, almost half the traffic to the website came from outside Pakistan from expatriate Pakistanis interested in the property market.

In February 2013, Zameen.com rolled out the Urdu version of its website. In March 2013, the company launched a mobile version of the website. In 2015, the company introduced 'Search Trends' tool allows users to explore real estate trends prevalent in the Pakistani marketplace based on the searches launched for different projects as divided into cities, localities, and sub-localities. The information is updated each month; rendered in a graphical format. Furthermore, the product allows users to obtain a holistic picture of the most popular with buyers and renters at any given point over the last 12-month period.

In February 2016, Zameen.com launched the Pakistan Real Estate Price Index, which was created in collaboration with Lahore University of Management Sciences.

In November 2019, Zameen.com launched Plot Finder, a tool that allows users to access detailed, geo-coded maps of 2,500 housing projects across 38 cities in Pakistan.

In January 2020, the company introduced a new tool titled 'Property Bank'. According to the company's Country Head, the feature will "cater to tens of thousands of seller leads that go to waste due to market inefficiencies." Additionally, it will catalogue more than 25,000 properties presently listed on the company website that remain without any agency representation.

Emerging Markets Property Group (EMPG) 
The two brothers also co-founded the Dubai-based Emerging Markets Property Group in 2015 and Zameen.com was brought under its umbrella. EMPG saw significant investment and expansion in the years since it was founded with the group currently owning and operating Zameen.com in Pakistan, Bayut in the UAE, Saudi Arabia and Jordan; Bproperty.com in Bangladesh; Mubawab in Morocco and Tunisia; and Kaidee in Thailand.

In April 2020, EMPG and the Netherlands-based OLX Group announced a merger of their operations in Pakistan, Egypt, Lebanon, the UAE, Saudi Arabia, Kuwait, Qatar, Bahrain, and Oman, together with the OLX-owned Dubai-based classifieds website, Dubizzle. As a result of the transaction, EMPG's valuation crossed $1 billion, making it a unicorn company; while OLX Group became EMPG's largest single shareholder with a 39% stake.

Business model 
Initially, Zameen.com allowed free property listings on its website, but shifted to the paid advertisements model in 2010. In 2014, the company launched a monthly real estate print publication. Today, Zameen.com offers exclusive sales and marketing services to real estate developers to generate revenue.

Brand

Logo 
Zameen.com launched in 2006, bearing the "Pakistan Property Portal" tagline as part of its official logo. This logo inscription underwent a change to the more elaborate "Pakistan's No. 1 Property Website" in 2011. More recently, in 2018, it was further modified to read the Urdu transliteration of the brand's popular TVC slogan: "Har Pata, Humain Pata Hai" (Lit: We Know Every Address).

TV Campaigns 
By September 2018, Zameen.com had successfully launched four TV campaigns promoting its website and brand operations. The first of these initiatives saw the company adopt the "Har Pata, Humain Pata Hai" slogan, which has since become part of its logo as well.

In 2017, actor Fawad Khan starred in a TV campaign titled "Humain Pata Hai Aap Ke Dil Ki Baat", coming on board as the company's official brand ambassador. The company's 2018 campaign, popularized with its "We can help you find a house, but only you can make it a home" TVC tagline, again featured Fawad Khan.

Events & exhibitions
Zameen.com organised its first exhibition 'Pakistan Real Estate Expo (PREEX) 2013' in collaboration with Government of Pakistan. A year later, the company held Zameen.com Property Expo 2014, where over 50 exhibitors showcased their real estate projects.

In August 2015, Zameen.com organized a two-day 'DHA Lahore Property Festival 2015' in collaboration with the Defence Housing Authority, a leading real estate developer in Pakistan. This was the first time the portal collaborated with a private developer to organize a property event.

In November 2015, Zameen.com hosted Zameen.com Property Expo 2015.  The event was visited by 45,000 people.

In April 2016, the portal organised two property fairs (one in Islamabad and the other in Karachi), followed by a large-scale expo in Lahore in May.

In December 2016, Zameen.com held two property expos in Lahore and Islamabad, followed by another property event organised in Karachi in January 2017.

Since then, the expos have become a regular affair with prominent exhibitions held in Lahore, Karachi and Islamabad every year since. In all, Zameen.com has held a total of 16 expos, making Zameen Expos the largest and longest running real estate exhibition of Pakistan. As of March 2019, over a million people, and more than 1,200 exhibitors have attended the expos over the years.

Zameen.com also made inroads in the international markets with its Pakistan Property Show Dubai, held at Dubai World Trade Center in October 2017. This was the first time Pakistani property was exclusively featured at Dubai World Trade Center. The event attracted a record 14,000 visitors—reportedly the highest for any exclusive event on Pakistani property.

The second edition of Pakistan Property Show Dubai was held on the 14th and 15 September 2018; again at the Dubai World Trade Center. The event saw 60 exhibitors from around Pakistan in attendance, attracting more than 17,000 visitors. This was followed by the third successful iteration of the event held on 6th and 7 December 2019.

In November 2018, Zameen.com held its first-ever expo in the Multan. This was followed by the company's now usual trio of expos organised in Karachi, Lahore and Islamabad.

The 2019 expo in Lahore marked a breakthrough moment for Pakistan's real estate sector. It introduced a number of technological firsts for the country's property market, including a demonstration of a 3D 'property walkthrough'.

On 10 and 11 September, Zameen.com hosted its 4th edition of Pakistan Property Show at the Dubai World Trade Center. The 2-day property expo hosted 60+ exhibitors, presented 200 projects from all over Pakistan. The event managed to attract a record-breaking 20,000 attendees.

Awards and honors
 In June 2016, Property Portal Watch (PPW), a global authority on real estate websites, named Zameen.com among top 5 property portals in the world at the PPW Conference held in Bangkok from May 31 to June 3.
 In October 2015, Zameen.com was named among top 8 global property portals 'to watch and learn from' at the PPW Conference held in Amsterdam from October 7 to 9.
Kashif Moten, a local journalist, declared in an article that Zameen.com was 'Pakistan's first property portal.'
The Express Tribune, an English-language newspaper in Pakistan dubbed Zameen.com 'Pakistan's largest real estate portal.'
The News, a leading English-language newspaper in Pakistan, stated that Zameen.com has 'revolutionized the online real estate industry in Pakistan.'
Simon Baker, an entrepreneur and the top authority on real estate portals, recognized Zameen.com as 'The Pakistan Leader' in his blog post.
In 2007, Zameen.com won the Best Property Award 2007 at the CNBC International Property Awards.
Zameen.com won the Best Property Portal in the World Award at the CNBC International Property Awards 2008.

See also
Bayut
Real Estate In Pakistan

References

External links
 

 
 
Real estate companies established in 2006
Companies based in Lahore
Internet properties established in 2006
Pakistani real estate websites